Heavy Metal Payback is the sixth solo album by German rapper Bushido, released 10 October 2008 under the record label ersguterjunge. The title of the album was taken from an earlier song titled "Heavy Metal Payback" from Aggro Ansage Nr. 2. Three singles were released: "Ching Ching", "Für immer jung" (feat. Karel Gott), and "Kennst du die Stars" (feat. Oliver Pocher). The album sold over 100,000 copies and received gold status in Germany.

Production 
The album was co-produced by Bushido. Most of the songs were produced by Martin Stock and Beatlefield (DJ Stickle & Chakuza).

Bushido organized an orchestra and a choir to record them. The orchestra was recorded in the great hall of slowakish radio and the recordings were mixed by DJ Stickle in the studio. Martin Stock conducted the orchestra.

Track listing 

Samples
"Es gibt kein wir" contains a sample of "Oxygene Part 2" performed by Jean-Michel Jarre.

Charts

Weekly charts

Year-end charts

Certifications

References 

2008 albums
Bushido (rapper) albums
German-language albums